Kalyaneshwar Mahadev Mandir (Maithili: कल्याणेश्वर महादेव मंदिर) was established by King Janaka in Mithila. The temple is also the part of Mithila Madhya Parikrama circuit. The temple is situated at Kalna village of Harlakhi block in Madhubani district. It is said that King Janaka established Shivlings in all the four directions from Janakpur. The Shivling of this temple is one of them. Since the temple is very ancient and historical, so it is very famous in the region.

Description 
The temple is located near Indo-Nepal Border area in Harlakhi block of Madhubani district. The pilgrims of the historical and the cultural journey Mithila Madhya Parikrama take second night rest at this place. Since the temple is related to Ramayana therefore, the Government of Bihar declared the site as tourist centre. According to the text Ramcharitmanas of Tulsi Das, the King Janaka did penance here devoted to his ishta devta Lord Shiva. Lord Shiva was pleased with the penance of the King Janaka and appeared in the form of Kalyaneshwar. Then King Janaka established a Shivling  here in the devotion to Lord Shiva and  God Viswakarma buit the temple around the Shivling. The temple is also considered as one of the gates of the ancient capital of Mithila.

Kalna Paramhansa 
The temple is also very famous for Kalna Baba Ashram. Kalna Baba is also known as Kalna Paramhansa. He was a spiritual leader and philosopher, who stayed at Kalyaneshwar Mahadev Mandir and taught the people coming there about spiritual knowledge. He is also considered as the avtar of Lord Shiva in the Kalyaneshwar Mahadev Mandir. He was very famous for his kindness and spiritual energy. It is said that he cured many people who come to him in the hope of solutions of their problems.

References 

Shiva temples
Mithila
Shaivism
Ramayana